Footballers' Wives (stylised as footballers wive$) is a British television drama surrounding the fictional Premier League football club Earls Park F.C., its players, and their wives. It was broadcast on the ITV network from 8 January 2002 to 14 April 2006. The show initially focuses on three very different couples, but from the third series onward it revolves around a complex love triangle between Tanya Turner (Zöe Lucker), Amber Gates (Laila Rouass), and Conrad Gates (Ben Price).

The first and second series each include eight episodes. The third comprises nine episodes, one of which is 90 minutes long. The fourth series also comprises nine episodes, two of which are 90 minutes long. The fifth and final series includes eight episodes, and the series premiere and finale are 90 minutes long. Typical episodes have a running time of approximately 45 minutes.

Series overview

Episodes

Series 1 (2002)

Series 2 (2003)

Series 3 (2004) 

 Note: Following the broadcast of the series finale, a one-hour special in which Zöe Lucker presented some of the most memorable moments from the first three series was broadcast. Behind-the-scenes footage and uncut footage from the show that had not been seen before was also shown.

Series 4 (2005)

Series 5 (2006)

Special (2006)
The Sport Relief special aired on Saturday 15 July.

References

External links 
 
 
 

Episodes
Lists of British drama television series episodes